The administrative divisions of Ukraine (tr. Administratyvnyi ustrii Ukrainy)  are subnational administrative divisions within the geographical area of Ukraine under the jurisdiction of the Ukrainian Constitution. Ukraine is a unitary state with 3 levels of administrative divisions: 27 regions (24 oblasts, 2 cities with special status and 1 autonomous republic), 136 raions and 1469 hromadas.

The latest reform of July 2020 radically reduced the second tier from 490 raions and 118 "cities of regional significance" to just 136 raions, with the "cities of regional significance" merging into the reformed raions. The overall structure did not change significantly from the middle of the 20th century. The next tier below raion are hromadas.

Following the annexations of Crimea and southeastern Ukraine by the Russian Federation, Autonomous Republic of Crimea and Sevastopol as well as portions of Donetsk, Kherson, Luhansk and Zaporizhzhia Oblasts came under the de facto administration of the Russian Federation. Internationally, most states have not recognized the Russian claims.

Overview

According to Article 133 of the Constitution of Ukraine, "the system of the administrative and territorial structure of Ukraine is composed of the Autonomous Republic of Crimea, oblasts, districts, cities, districts in city, settlements, and villages." Certain types of subdivision are not mentioned in the Constitution (i.e. rural settlements), but they are mentioned for regional composition. Also, regular raions (districts) are sometimes denoted as rural to distinguish them from raions in cities.

Ukraine's administrative divisions are divided as follows:
By geographical characteristics the units are divided on regions (such as autonomous republic, oblasts, districts, cities with special status) and places of settlement (cities, towns, villages).
By their status they can be administrative-territorial units (oblasts and districts), self-governed territorial units (cities, towns, villages). Also the autonomous republic has a unique status of territorial autonomy, while districts in cities combine both characteristics of administrative territorial as well as self-governed territorial units.
By position in the system of administrative division, the units divided into territorial units of prime level (cities without district division, districts in cities, towns, villages), of middle level (districts, cities with district division), and of higher level (autonomous republic, oblasts, cities with special status).
Administrative division has changed because some territories are not under the control of the government. For example, Sievierodonetsk has become the new central regional center.

Regions, cities, districts are governed by a state administration, a chief of which is appointed by the president after a nomination by the cabinet of ministers. Crimea has its own cabinet of ministers, however the state administration is represented by the office of the Presidential Representative of Ukraine. A basic and the lowest level of administrative division is a settlement that is governed by a local council (rada). Cities as a settlement always carry a special status within a region and have their own form of self-administration (municipality – vykonkom) and some may consist of their own city's districts (raions). City municipalities are governed by a mayor and a city council (miskrada). Some smaller cities, towns, and rural localities may be under control of city municipalities based on larger cities. Towns as well as villages are not controlled by state administration and are self-governed by either a town council (selyshchna rada) or a village council (silrada) within the limits of the Constitution and the laws of Ukraine (article 140 of the Constitution of Ukraine). Village councils may carry a combined jurisdiction which may include several villages and hamlets (selyshche). Unlike villages, each town council always has a separate jurisdiction which may be part of bigger city's council. Hamlet (selyshche) is a non-governed rural locality and is governed by a village council of nearby village.

From 2020
In the 2020 administrative reform, all populated places in Ukraine (except for two cities with special status: Kyiv and Sevastopol) were resubordinated to raions (districts). The new figure of 136 raions includes 10 in the Crimean region (though they are not presently functional) and Sevastopol.

History

Before the introduction of oblasts in 1932, Ukraine comprised 40 okruhas, which had replaced the former Russian Imperial guberniya (governorate) subdivisions.

In 1932 the territory of the Ukrainian SSR was re-established based on oblasts. Excluded in the administrative changes was Western Ukraine, which at that time formed part of the Second Polish Republic and shared in the Polish form of administrative division based on voivodeships.

In the post-World War II period, the Ukrainian Soviet Socialist Republic consisted of 25 oblasts and two cities with special status.

After the fall of the Soviet Union in 1991, Crimea obtained the status of an autonomous republic with its own government instead of a regional state administration.

 The top level: duchy (land) → palatinate (voivodeship) → regiments (polk) / palanka → governorate → okruha → oblast → TBD
 The intermediate level: apanage duchy → county (povit) / eldership (starostvo) → hundred (sotnia) → raion → county (povit)
 The local level: volost → kurin / community (hromada) → volost → city council (rada) → community (hromada)

First level 
There are three types of first-level administrative divisions: 24 oblasts, 1 autonomous republic and 2 cities with special status.

Autonomous republic

The Autonomous Republic of Crimea (Ukrainian: Автоно́мна Респу́бліка Крим, tr. Avtonomna Respublika Krym) geographically encompasses the major portion of the Crimean peninsula in southern Ukraine. Its capital is Simferopol. The Autonomous Republic of Crimea is the only region within Ukraine that has its own constitution.

On 16 March 2014, after the occupation of Crimea by the Russian military, a referendum on joining the Russian Federation was held. A majority of votes supported the measure. On 21 March 2014, the Russian Duma voted to annex Crimea as a subject into the Russian Federation. The Ukrainian government does not recognize the referendum or annexation of Crimea as legitimate. On 27 March, the UN General Assembly passed Resolution 68/262 by 100 to 11 votes, recognizing the referendum as invalid and denying any legal change in the status of Crimea and Sevastopol.

Oblasts

An oblast (Ukrainian: о́бласть, tr. oblast; plural: о́бласті, tr. oblasti) is on the first level of the administrative division of Ukraine.
 
Most oblasts are named after their administrative center. Volyn and Zakarpattia, whose respective capitals are Lutsk and Uzhhorod, are named after the historic regions Volhynia and Transcarpathia.

Cities with special status

Two cities have special status: Kyiv (the capital of Ukraine) and Sevastopol (occupied by Russia). Their special status puts them on the same administrative level as the oblasts, and thus under the direct supervision of the state via their respective local state administrations, which constitute the executive bodies of the cities.

Kyiv owes its special status to being the administrative center of the country, which grants it both additional powers and responsibilities.  Sevastopol's special status was carried over from the Soviet era, and was due to the city being the historical headquarters of the Black Sea Fleet. Following the annexation of Crimea by the Russian Federation, Sevastopol is controlled by Russia and is incorporated as a federal subject of Russia. It is recognized as a part of Ukraine by most of the international community.

Second level

Raions

Raions are smaller territorial units of subdivision in Ukraine. There are 136 raions. Following the December 2019 draft constitutional changes submitted to the Verkhovna Rada by President Volodymyr Zelensky, united territorial communities (136 new raions) have replaced the former 490 raions of Ukraine.

Urban raion
An urban raion is subordinate to the city administration.

Third level 

Ukraine has two types of settlements: rural and urban. Rural populated areas (сільський населений пункт) can be either a village (село, selo) or a rural settlement (селище). Urban populated areas (міський населений пункт) can be either a city (містo) or an urban-type settlement (селище міського типу). For the sake of brevity, urbanized settlements are sometimes classified as towns in the English language.

Changes to a settlement's status can be made only by the Verkhovna Rada. The size of a settlement does not ultimately define its status, although is a major factor. For example, the city of Prypiat still retains its status, while having a population of zero, due to its infrastructure, including buildings, roads, and utility networks.

The typical Ukrainian misto ought to be considered a city, not a town (compare to City status in the United Kingdom). However, the city's subordination to either an oblast or raion also should be taken into account, especially in the political sense. Some of urbanized settlements may be cities of raion subordination, although it could seem confusing, a type of settlement should be considered first as its status is given for administrative purposes.

Cities

According to Ukrainian law a city (Ukrainian: мі́сто, tr. misto; plural: міста́, tr. mista) in Ukraine is a locality of at least 10,000 people. Cities may carry various status. Some may be of national importance, others of regional (oblast) importance, and the rest of district (raion) importance. For example, the cities of Kyiv and of Sevastopol have special status of national significance and each is officially classified as a city with a special status, which administratively is equivalent to an oblast. Mayors of those cities, in general, as are governors of oblasts, are appointed by the President of Ukraine. However, the status of the mayor of Kyiv is somewhat more complex, and for further information see Legal status and local government of Kyiv. The status of Sevastopol is also unique.

Almost every oblast has at least one city of regional subordination (importance), which is the administrative center (capital) of that oblast. However, some other big cities within the oblast may have such status as well. The cities of oblast subordination have the same importance of a raion, and often are the administrative centers of such. In addition to regular raions, several Ukrainian cities with national or oblast status are further divided into city raions which may include other cities, towns and villages. In 2010, Ukraine had 23 such cities with their own city raions.

Many raions also have city municipalities of its level of subordination (importance). Those are usually the administrative centers (capitals). Notice that not all raions have a city as their administrative center; however all the raion centers are at least urban-like (urbanized). All administrative centers have their own form of self-administration. The municipalities of a raion subordination may administer several adjacent local councils (municipalities), usually rural. If a raion has several cities of raion (district) level, they may share administrative power for the raion.

Other municipalities
In addition to city municipalities, Ukraine has urban-like municipalities. The lowest form of self-administration are the rural municipalities and villages. A rural municipality may consist of a single village, usually big, or a combination of other rural villages or localities. Note that some villages also have some additional, very small settlements. Those settlements, together with the home village, combine a local (rural) municipality (silrada). For simplicity's sake, a silrada (rural municipality) is usually referred to as a village and is the lowest level of administrative division. The status of any settlement is granted by the Verkhovna Rada.

Hromadas 

The territorial hromadas (Ukrainian: територіа́льна грома́да, tr. terytorialna hromada; lit. 'territorial community'), or simlply hromadas (Ukrainian: грома́да, tr. hromada; plural: грома́ди, tr. hromady) were established by the Government of Ukraine on 12 June 2020 as a part of administrative reform that started in 2015.

There are 1,469 hromadas in total.

Other administrations

Ukraine also has several settlements known as viiskove mistechko which were former military installations. Since the fall of the Soviet Union, the secrecy of such settlements has been unveiled, however, the towns are subordinated directly to the Ministry of Defense and do not have their own civil administrations. Such military installations are like ghost towns that are not even identified on a map. One of them, on the border of the Kyiv and Zhytomyr Oblasts is Makarov-1.

A special territory known as the zone of alienation falls under the jurisdiction of the Ministry of Emergencies and was the most severely affected territory by the Chernobyl disaster. Additionally, various restricted nature preserves known as Zapovednik fall under the jurisdiction of the Ministry of Ecology.

Due to the Russo-Ukrainian War, the status of civil–military administrations was created in territories of Donetsk and Luhansk oblasts where the respective local government units cannot exercise their constitutionally guaranteed powers.

Currently, Ukraine has the following three enclaves:
The city of Slavutych which is administratively subordinated directly to Kyiv Oblast while being completely surrounded by neighboring Chernihiv Oblast.
The settlement of Bile which is located on Snake Island and is fully surrounded by the Black Sea was established in 2007 and is part of the Vylkove urban hromada, Odesa Oblast.
The town of Kotsiubynske which is part of the Kyiv Oblast and is completely surrounded by the city of Kyiv.

Metropolitan areas
Ukraine has seven major agglomerated metropolitan areas (conurbations). These conurbation areas are not officially recognized and remain to be administered according to official oblast-raion system of subdivision. Some of them are:
Kyiv includes towns such as Irpin, Boryspil, and Fastiv
Kharkiv includes towns such as Chuhuiv, Merefa, and numerous other settlements
Donetsk includes towns such as Makiivka, Khartsyzk, and others
Dnipro with Kamianske and Novomoskovsk
Odesa with Chornomorsk and Ovidiopol

The other three major areas are the metropolitan areas of such cities: Kryvyi Rih, Lviv, Zaporizhzhia.

Other divisions
 

Beside the administrative divisions, geographical divisions are at times used for reference or statistical purposes. The division splits Ukraine into four to six geographic areas: Western Ukraine, Eastern Ukraine, Southern Ukraine, Central Ukraine, Northern Ukraine (occasionally used).

See also

 Geography of Ukraine
 ISO 3166-2:UA
 List of places in Ukraine named after people
 Local government in Ukraine

References

External links

 

 
Ukraine